A Different Loyalty is a 2004 drama film inspired by the story of British traitor Kim Philby's love affair and marriage to Eleanor Brewer in Beirut and his eventual defection to the Soviet Union.  The story takes place in the 1960s and stars Sharon Stone and Rupert Everett.  In the film, the characters have fictitious names.  The film was entered into the 26th Moscow International Film Festival.

Though not credited, the story is based on Eleanor Brewer Philby's 1967 book Kim Philby: The Spy I Loved, published in 1967. The screenplay was written by Jim Piddock. It was a Canada/UK/United States co-production. A Different Loyalty was not released theatrically in the United States.

Cast

References

External links
 
 
 Preview

2004 films
2004 drama films
English-language Canadian films
2000s English-language films
2000s Russian-language films
British drama films
British spy films
Canadian drama films
Canadian spy films
Films directed by Marek Kanievska
Films scored by Normand Corbeil
Films à clef
Cold War spy films
Spy films based on actual events
2000s Canadian films
2000s British films